Dream is a musical revue based on the songs of Johnny Mercer. The book is by Jack Wrangler and co-producer Louise Westergaard. The show ran on Broadway in 1997.

Production
The revue opened on Broadway on April 3, 1997 at the Royale Theatre after twenty-four previews. Directed and choreographed by Wayne Cilento, the costumes are by Ann Hould-Ward, lighting by Ken Billington and sets by David Mitchell. The cast featured Lesley Ann Warren, John Pizzarelli, Margaret Whiting, Jessica Molaskey and Brooks Ashmanskas.

It closed on July 6, 1997 after 109 performances.

Songs
All lyrics by Johnny Mercer

Act I 		 
Dream - Music by Johnny Mercer
Lazybones - Music by Hoagy Carmichael
On Behalf of the Traveling Salesmen - Music by Walter Donaldson
Pardon My Southern Accent - Music by Matt Malneck
You Must Have Been a Beautiful Baby - Music by Harry Warren
Have You Got Any Castles, Baby? - Music by Richard Whiting
Goody, Goody - Music by Matt Malneck
Skylark - Music by Hoagy Carmichael
The Dixieland Band - Music by Bernie Hanighen
I Had Myself A True Love / I Wonder What Became of - Music by Harold Arlen
Jamboree Jones Jive - Music by Johnny Mercer
Fools Rush In - Music by Rube Bloom
Come Rain or Come Shine - Music by Harold Arlen
Out Of This World - Music by Harold Arlen
I Remember You - Music by Victor Schertzinger
Blues in the Night - Music by Harold Arlen
One For My Baby - Music by Harold Arlen
You Were Never Lovelier - Music by Jerome Kern
Satin Doll - Music by Billy Strayhorn and Duke Ellington
I'm Old Fashioned - Music by Jerome Kern
Dearly Beloved - Music by Jerome Kern
This Time The Dream's On Me - Music by Harold Arlen
Something's Gotta Give - Music by Johnny Mercer
Too Marvelous For Words - Music by Richard Whiting

Act II 
I Thought About You - Music by Jimmy Van Heusen
And The Angels Sing - Music by Ziggy Elman
The Fleet's In - Music by Victor Schertzinger
G.I. Jive - Music by Johnny Mercer
I'm Doin' It For Defense - Music by Harold Arlen
Tangerine - Music by Victor Schertzinger
Day In, Day Out - Music by Rube Bloom
Jeepers Creepers - Music by Harry Warren
That Old Black Magic - Music by Harold Arlen
Laura - Music by David Raksin
You Go Your Way - Music by Johnny Mercer
My Shining Hour - Music by Harold Arlen
Hooray For Hollywood - Music by Richard Whiting
Accentuate the Positive - Music by Harold Arlen
In The Cool, Cool, Cool of the Evening - Music by Hoagy Carmichael
Charade / Days of Wine and Roses - Music by Henry Mancini
Moon River - Music by Henry Mancini
On The Atchison, Topeka and the Santa Fe - Music by Harry Warren

Awards and nominations
Tony Award for Best Choreography (Wayne Cilento, nominee)

References

External links
Internet Broadway Database listing
New York Times review

Revues
Broadway musicals
1997 musicals
Jukebox musicals
Johnny Mercer